Fatuma may refer to:

 Fatuma Abdulkadir Adan, Kenyan lawyer and peace ambassador
 Fatuma Abdullahi Insaniya, Somali diplomat
 Fatuma Ali Saman, Kenyan educationist and women's rights campaigner
 Fatuma binti Yusuf al-Alawi, queen of Unguja in pre-Sultanate Zanzibar
 Fatuma Gedi, Kenyan politician
 Fatuma Ibrahim Ali, Kenyan politician
 Fatuma Roba, Ethiopian long-distance runner
 Fatuma Sado, Ethiopian long-distance runner

Feminine given names